The WCA National Division One is the top league for women in the sport of shinty, and is run by the Women's Camanachd Association. Below that from season 2016 there was a return to regional second level set-up with a WCA North Division 2 and WCA South Division 2. All three leagues are sponsored by Marine Harvest. This progression is evidence of the fact that women's shinty is the fastest growing section in Scotland's oldest sport.

In 2016, Skye Camanachd won the league for the first time, clinching the title by comprehensively beating Aberdour Ladies 9-0 in their final league fixture at Silver Sands, Fife on Sunday 14 August 2016. The Skye team narrowly missed out on a famous double when they were beaten 4-2 by Lochaber in the Valerie Fraser Trophy later that month.

Teams
At present, seven clubs compete in the league:

Aberdour Shinty Club
Ardnamurchan Camanachd
Badenoch Ladies
Glasgow Mid-Argyll
Inverness Shinty Club
Lochaber Camanachd
Skye Camanachd

National Division One Winners and Runners-Up
 2022: Winners: Badenoch, Runners-up Skye Camanachd
 2019: Winners: Badenoch(formerly Badenoch & Strathspey), Runners-up Skye Camanachd
 2018: Winners: Skye Camanachd, Runners-up: Badenoch & Strathspey
 2017: Winners: Skye Camanachd, Runners-up: Lochaber
 2016: Winners: Skye Camanachd, Runners-up: Glasgow Mid Argyll
 2015: Winners: Glasgow Mid Argyll, Runners-up: Badenoch & Strathspey
 2014: Winners: Glasgow Mid Argyll, Runners-up: Skye Camanachd
 2013: Winners: Glasgow Mid Argyll,
 2012: Winners: Glengarry,
 2011: Winners: Glengarry,
 2010:
 2009: Winners: Glengarry, Runners-up: Tír Conaill Harps
 2008: 
 2007: Winners: Glasgow Mid Argyll,
 2006: Winners: Glengarry, Runners-up: Glasgow Mid Argyll
 2005:

List of Winners

List of Runners-Up

References

Shinty competitions